State Route 238 (SR 238) was a short northwest–southeast state highway in the southwestern portion of Ohio. Its northern terminus was at SR 38 in the downtown of the Fayette County village.

This route provided a connection for the parallel state-maintained roadways at the northeastern end of the run in parallel.

Route description
All of SR 238 was located in the eastern portion of Fayette County. In a 2013 traffic survey, around 2,380 cars traveled on SR 238 on average daily.

The short journey of SR 238 commenced at the rural Union Township intersection of US 62 and SR 3 and Old Springfield Road (CR 137). Heading northwest from there, the two-lane state highway traveled amidst a vastness of farmland, while passing by a couple of homes along the way. After crossing a set of railroad tracks, SR 238 entered Bloomingburg. With the Bloomingburg Cemetery abutting the west side of the highway, SR 238, which is now known as Main Street, passed a business and some residences prior to coming to an end at its junction with SR 38 at a four-way stop intersection in the village's downtown area.

History
SR 238 was designated in 1924 along the routing that it occupied for its entire history near Bloomingburg. The highway did not experience any significant changes between its designation and decommissioning between 2014 and 2015, when it was replaced by a rerouted SR 38.

Major intersections

References

238
Transportation in Fayette County, Ohio